Šarkanica is a national nature reserve in the Slovak municipalities of Tisovec and Muráň in the Revúca and Rimavská Sobota District. The nature reserve covers an area of 454 ha. It has a protection level of 5 under the Slovak nature protection system. The nature reserve is part of the Muránska planina National Park.

Description
The Šarkanica national nature reserve protects a geologically and geomorphologically significant part of the Muránska planina plateau with preserved natural rock and forest biotopes. It has a rich representation of protected species of plants and animals.

Recreation
The area is accessible for hikers via the hiking path between Tisovec and Siváková which is indicated with green signs.

References

Geography of Banská Bystrica Region
Protected areas of Slovakia